Greater Dhaka is the conurbation surrounding the Bangladeshi capital city of Dhaka, which has grown into one of the world's largest megacities, and shows a very rapid rate of expansion.  Dhaka not only grows because it is the capital and largest urban center but also due to massive internal displacement from millions of people living in a perennially flood-prone river delta.

Definition
The area of Dhaka Statistical Metropolitan Area was 1,353 square kilometers, of which Dhaka City Corporation occupied 276 square kilometers at the 2001 census.  The Dhaka Statistical Metropolitan Area (SMA) covers the Dhaka Municipal Corporation area and Savar Upazila and Keraniganj Upazila of Dhaka District (note: only a portion of the district is part of the metropolitan area), Narayanganj Sadar Upazila, Bandar Upazila and Rupganj Upazila of Narayanganj District, Gazipur Sadar Upazila and Kaliakair Upazila of Gazipur District, and Narsingdi Sadar Upazila and Palash Upazila of Narsingdi District.  New 2021 estimates for Bangladesh Bureau of Statistics (web) tally just over 24 million for 4 districts in their entirety. (white area in map also includes 6 districts: Manikganj and Munshiganj)

Components of the Metropolitan Area
Since the 2001 Census, Dhaka has grown tremendously, as evidenced by the 2011 Census figures.  However, definitions were changed between the two censuses, with several outlying upazilas situated in neighbouring administrative districts being included in the expanded definition.  The following table shows the revision of the metropolitan area, shown in blue and red on map, based on 2011 figures:

References

External links
^ Bangladesh Bureau of Statistics, Statistical Pocket Book, 2008 (pdf-file) 2008 Population Estimate. View Page 7 for the population of Dhaka Metropolitan Area.

 
Geography of Dhaka Division